Edward Frank Hummert, Jr. (June 2, 1884 – March 12, 1966), professionally known as Frank Hummert and sometimes credited as E. Frank Hummert, was an American advertising agent originally but was best known for writing/producing episodes of nearly 100 daytime/primetime radio dramas and soap opera serials between the 1930s and the 1950s.

Hummert, along with his wife Anne Hummert, became the monarchs of daytime radio with dramas such as Just Plain Bill (1932–55), The Romance of Helen Trent (1933–60), Ma Perkins (1933–60), and Backstage Wife (1935–59). After the success of these dramas, the Hummerts formed Hummert Radio Productions. Under Hummert Productions, creating the basic plots and assigning an assembly line of writers to complete the scripts, they produced more than 40 radio shows, including the soap operas Stella Dallas (1938–55) and Young Widder Brown (1938–56); the mystery shows Mr. Keen, Tracer of Lost Persons (1937–54), and Mr. Chameleon (1948–51); and the musical programs The American Album of Familiar Music (1931–51) and Manhattan Merry-Go-Round (1933–49). In all, the Hummerts are credited with the creation/production of 61 radio soap operas.

By 1937, with his success on radio and potential advertisers lining up to become clients, Hummert had become advertising's highest paid executive.

Early life
Edward Frank Hummert, Jr. was born to parents Edward F. and Carrie Hummert in St. Louis, Missouri on June 2 in the disputed year of 1884. According to a majority of sources and public records on Frank Hummert, Hummert was born June 2, 1884. However, this date is disputed against many sources and radio historians. For example, the Encyclopædia Britannica lists Hummert's birth year as 1879, while media historian Christopher H. Sterling lists Hummert's birth year as 1885. Even radio historian Jim Cox lists two different birth years in two separate books. In The Great Radio Soap Operas, published in 1999, Cox lists Hummert's birth year as 1882. But in Frank and Anne Hummert's Radio Factory, published in 2003, he gives the birth year as 1884.

Hummert's mother came from French ancestry and his father was English. The latter was a mercantilist in lace manufacturing and importing who traveled extensively for Rice, Stix & Co. As a result, Hummert and his family were accustomed to moving around. Hummert, in his early years, lived in various places across the United States and Europe before his father began operating his own merchandising-exporting venture under the label "Hummert Hatfield Co." and the family permanently settled in St. Louis.

Hummert, hoping to take over his father's business, began preparatory studies at the Stonyhurst College in Lancashire, England. By the age of 20, Hummert decided against his father's business and after finishing studies at Stonyhurst, Hummert returned to Missouri and graduated from Saint Louis University.

Hummert turned to public media and soon landed a reporting assignment with the Saint Louis Post-Dispatch and after that assignment ended, Hummert landed reporting jobs for the news journal of the Catholic Archdiocese in Chicago, New World and the International News Syndicate of The New York Times.

Career

In advertising
In 1920, Hummert began working in his new field of interest, advertising. He was hired as chief copywriter for Albert Lasker's Lord & Thomas agency in New York. Hummert earned a starting salary of $50,000 a year. One of Hummert's first big breaks in advertising came when he coined the slogan "For the skin you love to touch" for soap manufacturer Procter & Gamble's Camay. While at Lord & Thomas, Hummert created ads and slogans for big name companies such as Ovaltine, Quaker Quick Macaroni, Gold Medal Flour and Palmolive soap.

In 1927, Hummert left Lord & Thomas and accepted a position with Hill Blackett and J.G. Sample as vice president of their Chicago based agency. In 1943, the agency was renamed the Blackett-Sample-Hummert agency.

In radio
In 1927, Hummert hired a new assistant. That assistant was 22-year-old Anne Ashenhurst (née Schumacher). Ashenhurst was nearly 21 years Hummert's junior. By the age of 22, Ashenhurst had already graduated from Goucher College in 1925, went to Paris, got a job with the International Herald Tribune, (now known as the International New York Times), been married to and divorced from newspaper reporter John Ashenhurst and had a son, all in the span of two years.

They began collaborating in radio in 1932 and married in 1935.

Just Plain Bill and early radio years
The Hummerts earliest radio serial was a soap opera by the name of Betty and Bob. Betty and Bob, sponsored by General Mills' Gold Medal Flour, was about the marriage of a secretary of her wealthy boss, whose disapproving father cuts Bob out of the will. The program sustained an eight-year run from 1932-1940.

Also in 1932, their long-running soap Ma Perkins starring Virginia Payne premiered on the radio. Ma Perkins centered around "Ma" who owned and operated a lumber yard in the fictional small Southern town of Rushville Center (population 4000), where the plotlines pivoted around her interactions with the local townsfolk and the ongoing dilemmas of her three children, Evey, Fay and John. The program ended in November 1960.

In September 1932, Just Plain Bill, (under the name Bill the Barber), premiered on CBS Radio. The series revolved around a barber who marries above his league. Just Plain Bill and Ma Perkins were the start of Hummert's radio empire. Another popular radio serial created by the Hummerts was Skippy, based on the popularity of the eponymous comics series by Percy Crosby.

Helen Trent and radio success
In their first year of radio, Hummert and Schumacher created Just Plain Bill and Ma Perkins, (which both enjoyed extensive 20-plus year runs on radio), for the daytime radio schedule. Their next major hit was The Romance of Helen Trent which premiered October 30, 1933, on CBS. The program revolved the personal romantic life of Helen Trent and the continuing question: Can a woman of 35 find love? The program ended after 27 years in June 1960 and the broadcast of 7,222 episodes; more than any other radio soap opera.

With the premieres of Mr. Keen, Tracer of Lost Persons, The American Album of Familiar Music, Manhattan Merry-Go-Round and Backstage Wife between 1931 and 1937, Blackett-Sample-Hummert were producing 46% of shows on the daytime schedule.

With the beginning of the 17-year run of Stella Dallas in 1938, the Hummert factory was underway. In 1943, B-S-H reorganized to form Dancer Fitzgerald Sample and the Hummerts spun off their own radio production company, Air Features, Inc., which continued to control the airwaves and purchase air time through DFS.

In addition to their daytime soap operas, the Hummerts produced a number of musical programs and crime/mystery shows. At one point, their output included 18 separate serials on the air and up to 90 episodes a week. Other Hummert programs included Amanda of Honeymoon Hill, Judy and Jane, Little Orphan Annie, Frontpage Farrell, Inspector Thorne, Hearthstone of the Death Squad and The American Melody Hour.

Personal life and death
Not much is known about Hummert's private life or his first marriage as Hummert was a notoriously private man. But public records have now surfaced and according to radio historian Jim Cox, Hummert married the former Adeline E. Woodlock (1888–1934) in 1908 in St. Louis. Woodlock and her family resided just a few blocks away from Hummert and his family. Hummert was German Catholic and Woodlock was Irish Catholic.

Adeline Hummert died on May 11, 1934. Frank and Adeline were married for 26 years at the time of her death. They had no children. Hummert remarried to Anne Ashenhurst, his former assistant at Blackett-Sample-Hummert, in 1935.

Hummert died on March 12, 1966, in Manhattan.  He was 81. Anne Hummert, who never remarried again, died a multimillionaire on July 5, 1996, in her Fifth Avenue apartment at the age of 91.

Radio credits

References

External links

Anne and Frank Hummert Scripts at the University of Wyoming - American Heritage Center

1884 births
1966 deaths
American radio writers
American radio producers
American people of French descent
American people of English descent